The 1928–29 Divisione Nazionale season was won by Bologna. This was the last edition of the Divisione Nazionale until it was succeeded by the creation of the Serie A and the Serie B.

Format changes
In 1928 the fascists allowed for 1929 the start of the Serie A they stopped in 1926, not before to readmit SS Lazio and SC Napoli to allow a wider representation of Southern Italy, and AS Livorno and La Dominante to avoid odd groups.

More, during the summer the FIGC decided another expansion of the championship to allow a wider representation of the territories annexed after WWI, to save the remaining two clubs of the closing season, and to include AC Fiorentina and three other minor clubs, effectively making the new tournament a mixed Serie A-Serie B championship that should split into the two leagues.

First phase

Group A

Classification

Results table

Group B

Classification

Results table

Serie A qualifications

Both clubs were admitted to the Serie A to allow a wider representation of Southern Italy.

Mitropa qualifications
Italy was invited to join the 1929 Mitropa Cup when the championship was not yet finished, so the FIGC decided a playoff between the apparent runners-up Juventus and Milan, and two out of the three remaining football giants Inter and Genoa.

National Finals

Because of the sole points were considered by the championship regulations, with no relevance to the aggregation of goals, a tie-break was needed.

Tie-break in Rome

Top goalscorers

References and sources
Almanacco Illustrato del Calcio - La Storia 1898-2004, Panini Edizioni, Modena, September 2005

Footnotes

Serie A seasons
Italy
1928–29 in Italian football leagues